Paul Scheffer (Nijmegen, 3 September 1954) is a Dutch author, he was professor at the Universiteit van Amsterdam between 2003 and 2011, currently he is professor of European studies at Tilburg University. Paul Scheffer is also a prominent member of the Dutch Labour Party.

Bibliography
In 2000, he wrote an essay Het multiculturele drama (approximate translation: "The multicultural drama”) which was very influential in shaping the debate on multiculturalism and immigration in the Netherlands.

His 2007 book, Het land van aankomst, was published in English in 2011 as "Immigrant Nations", and deals with the overlaps between multiculturalism in the Netherlands and immigration to the Netherlands. The central idea of this book is that "immigration always has been and is a process of alienation for both the newcomers and the natives".

References

1954 births
Living people
Critics of multiculturalism
Labour Party (Netherlands) politicians
Academic staff of Tilburg University
Academic staff of the University of Amsterdam
People from Nijmegen